The North River is a  river in the western portion of the state of Alabama, United States.  It is a tributary of the Black Warrior River, joining it just north of Tuscaloosa.

References

Rivers of Alabama
Rivers of Tuscaloosa County, Alabama
Rivers of Fayette County, Alabama